Acrocinonide (developmental code name SD 2102-18; also known as triamcinolone acroleinide) is a synthetic glucocorticoid corticosteroid which was never marketed.

References

Acroleinides
Primary alcohols
Secondary alcohols
Corticosteroid cyclic ketals
Diketones
Fluoroarenes
Glucocorticoids
Pregnanes